Type 910 weapon trials ship (NATO reporting name:Dahua-II class) is a type of very little known auxiliary ship built in the People’s Republic of China (PRC) for the People's Liberation Army Navy (PLAN),
and it is a follow-on of earlier Type 909A weapon trials ship, which in turn, is a follow-on of Type 909 weapon trials ship built earlier.Developed from Type 909A, Type 910 is larger and has longer endurance/range, so it can take longer missions when conducting weapon and sensors trials. Specification: 
Length: 129.3 meter
Beam: 17 meter
Displacement: 6080 ton
Endurance: 5000 nautical miles
As of 2022, a total of four ships have been identified:

References

Auxiliary ships of the People's Liberation Army Navy